M. L. B. Sturkey House is a historic home located at McCormick in McCormick County, South Carolina.  It was built about 1895, and is a one-story, frame cottage with Queen Anne style detailing.  It consists of gable front main section, with a wing and a rear addition. It was built by M. L. B. Sturkey, one of McCormick's most prominent early residents and leader in the formation of McCormick County.

It was listed on the National Register of Historic Places in 1985.

References

Houses on the National Register of Historic Places in South Carolina
Queen Anne architecture in South Carolina
Houses completed in 1895
Houses in McCormick County, South Carolina
National Register of Historic Places in McCormick County, South Carolina